Clearwater Features Ltd. was a British film production company (based first in Battersea and then at Shepperton Studios) that produced the first two series of the children's television series Thomas the Tank Engine & Friends from 1984 to 1986. Clearwater is also known for creating the short lived children's TV series TUGS.

History
The company was founded in the early 1970s by Gerry Anderson alumni Ken Turner and David Mitton, and produced television commercials as well as miniature effects for films and TV shows. Turner left the company in 1979, to be replaced by American-born director and producer Robert D. Cardona.

The production logo of Clearwater Features was a pink Buick Y-Job parked at a film studio with palm trees, based on Clearwater, Florida, and it appeared on every ending of every episode of Thomas the Tank Engine from series 1 and 2, and also appeared on a flag of a barge in the TUGS episode 4th of July.

The company closed down on New Year's Eve 1990 because of TUGS' conclusion. When the studio closed, David Mitton became part of The Britt Allcroft Company, and Robert D. Cardona went to live in Canada. Britt Allcroft, returning home from the US, purchased the models and sets which were used for TUGS, and the show Thomas the Tank Engine & Friends remained in production by The Britt Allcroft Company (later Gullane Entertainment) from 1984 until 2003, when it was produced by HIT Entertainment.

Key people
 Ken Turner, David Mitton – co-founder
 Robert D. Cardona – co-CEO (1979–1990)
 Terry Permane – lighting, cameraman, director of photography
 Bob Gauld-Galliers – art director
 Mike O'Donnell, Junior Campbell – composers
 John Attwell – cameraman
 Nigel Parkes – editor

Produced

TV series
Thomas the Tank Engine & Friends / 1984-1986 - created by Wilbert Awdry; developed by Britt Allcroft
TUGS / 1989 - created by David Mitton and Robert D. Cardona

Others
Various British TV Adverts
BBC1 (Idents with Train)

Periscope lens system
The Clearwater Periscope lens system was a type of television camera developed in 1983 by Clearwater Features for use on the children's television series Thomas the Tank Engine & Friends and Tugs. The cameras were used together with live action model animation, to produce the image of character movements at eye level. Only two of these camera systems were ever made. The system used for TUGS was later shipped off to Canada and modified for the filming of Theodore Tugboat.

References

Defunct film and television production companies of the United Kingdom
Television production companies of the United Kingdom
Film production companies of the United Kingdom
British companies established in 1979
Mass media companies established in 1979
Mass media companies disestablished in 1990
1979 establishments in England
1990 disestablishments in England